The Manila Police District (MPD) is the agency of the Philippine National Police (PNP) responsible for law enforcement in the City of Manila. Formerly known as the Western Police District (WPD), the MPD is under the National Capital Region Police Office (NCRPO), which also handles the Quezon City, Eastern, Northern and Southern Police Districts.

History

American period
The MPD was created as the Metropolitan Police Force of Manila by Act No. 70 of the Taft Commission. An entirely American body, the force was first stationed at the Goldenberg Mansion, San Miguel. Being provost marshal, Arthur MacArthur, Jr. was named first Manila police chief. With the enactment of Act No. 183 that established the Manila city charter on July 31, 1901, the force was reorganized and was headed by Capt. George Curry. The Metropolitan Police Force of Manila was renamed into the "Manila Police District," and was initially composed by 357 troops from the American Volunteer Force to the Philippines. The MPD has jurisdiction five miles from the city limits and three miles from the shores to Manila Bay. This led into disputes with the Philippine Constabulary, which had police powers elsewhere in the Philippines. In 1907, the MPD was split into two: the Meisic Police Station north of the Pasig River and the Luneta Police Station south of the river. By 1935, the headquarters was moved to the new Manila City Hall.

On March 2, 1936, Antonio Torres, then a member of the  Manila City Council, was appointed chief, the first Filipino do so. However, in 1942 at the outset of World War II, the Kempetai, the Japanese Military Police, ordered Torres to submit to their authority. After the Battle of Manila, the combined American and Filipino troops reorganized the police force, and Allied forces were appointed chiefs until the appointment of Lamberto Javalera as acting chief of police.

Third Republic
In 1949, the MPD transferred their headquarters for the last time, in a newly constructed building at the corner of San Marcelino and Isaac Peral (now United Nations Avenue); the funding of the reconstruction came from the Philippine Rehabilitation Act of 1948. By this time, the President of the Philippines had appointment powers to the office. Notable was the appointment of Ricardo Papa, who organized an anti-smuggling unit that minimized smuggling in the city.

Martial law to the present

On September 21, 1972, president Ferdinand Marcos declared martial law in the country and created the Integrated National Police, with the Philippine Constabulary as its nucleus. On December 20, 1974, James Barbers was appointed Superintendent (Police Chief) of the Western Police District (WPD). Metropolitan Police Force (MPF). On February 26, 1986, Marcos was overthrown after the People Power Revolution. A few months later, Alfredo Lim was appointed chief and increased the number of precincts from six to ten. Lim would later be director of the National Bureau of Investigation, Mayor of Manila and Senator. In 1990, the Interior and Local Government Act 1990.was promulgated, that created the Philippine National Police, absorbing the Philippine Constabulary. Other notable names who had been named as WPD chief are Hermogenes Ebdane on November 5, 1993, and Avelino Razon on June 16, 1996 and December 20, 1999. The two were later named chiefs of the PNP.

On July 20, 2005, the WPD reverted to their former name back to the Manila Police District.

Organization

The MPD is organized into eleven (11) police stations and several district support units:

Base Units
Administrative Support Units
 District Tactical Operations Center
 District Headquarters Support Unit
 District Headquarters Service Unit
 District Human Resources and Administration Office
 District Internal Affairs Service
 District Legal Unit
 District Chaplain Service
 District Information Technology Unit
 District Scene Of the Crime Operatives

Operations Support Units
 District Public Safety Battalion
 District Traffic Enforcement Group
 District Criminal Investigation and Detection Unit
 District Anti-Illegal Drugs - Special Operations Task Group
 District Public Information Office
 District Highway Patrol Group
 Criminal Investigation and Detection Group
 District Intelligence Division

Line Units
 MPD Station 1 (Balut Police Station) - Balut, Tondo
 MPD Station 2 (Moriones Police Station) - Moriones, Tondo
 MPD Station 3 (Sta Cruz Police Station) - Sta Cruz, Manila
 MPD Station 4 (Sampaloc Police Station) - Sampaloc, Manila
 MPD Station 5 (Ermita Police Station) - Ermita, Manila
 MPD Station 6 (Sta Ana Police Station) - Sta Ana, Manila
 MPD Station 7 (Abad Santos Police Station) - Jose Abad Santos, Manila
 MPD Station 8 (Sta Mesa Police Station) - Sta Mesa, Manila
 MPD Station 9 (Malate Police Station) - Malate, Manila
 MPD Station 10 (Pandacan Police Station) - Pandacan, Manila
 MPD Station 11 (MEISIC Police Station) - Meisic, Manila
 MPD Station 12 (Delpan Police Station) - Delpan, Manila
 MPD Station 13 (BASECO Police Station) - BASECO, Port Area Manila
 MPD Station 14 (Barbosa Police Station) - Bautista St, Quiapo, Manila

Criticism

The PNP in general, and the MPD in particular, is characterized as slow, unfit, trigger-happy and corrupt. Several policemen have been arrested for committing extortion against violators of the law (popularly known as "kotong," hence the term "kotong cop"). Police are also involved in shootouts, or using excessive force against suspects.

Recently two issues have been hurled against the MPD. One is the recent exposé of a policeman torturing a suspect in a police precinct in Tondo. The officer who allegedly tortured the suspect was filed with administrative chargers Another was the inept resolution of the Manila hostage crisis which resulted in the death of 8 tourists from Hong Kong. MPD chief Rolando Magtibay was sacked two days after the failed assault. His replacement, Senior Superintendent Francisco Villaroman, made acting head of the MPD, was replaced after one day. Police did not comment on his removal. However, the Philippine Daily Inquirer said Villaroman was among police officers charged in the disappearance of two Hong Kong residents in the Philippines in 1998 and 1999. Villaroman said that the matter was heavily politicized, as it was linked to the affairs of the then at-large Senator Panfilo Lacson.

Lists of chiefs

From establishment to Commonwealth
January 9, 1901: Arthur MacArthur, Jr.
July 31, 1901 – 1902:  George Curry
1901 - 1903: Mathew Harmon
1902 – July 1910: John E. Harding
July 1910 – 1911: John Fulton Green (acting)
1911–1913: John E. Harding
December 1, 1913 – June 16, 1918: CAPT. George H. Seaver
June 16, 1918 – January 9, 1920: CAPT. Anton Hohmann
January 9, 1920 – March 8, 1921: CAPT. Edwin C. Bopp
1921–1922: Gregorio M. Alcid (acting)
March 20, 1922 – about March 2, 1928: John William Green, III
About March 9, 1928 – 1930: CAPT. Gregorio M. Alcid (acting)
1930 - March 1, 1936: CAPT. Columbus E. Piatt
From Commonwealth to Western Police District
March 1, 1936 - January 1939: COL. Antonio C. Torres
1939 - 1940: COL. Juan F. Dominguez
1940 - 1945: COL. Manuel S. Turingan SR.
February 7, 1945: Marcus Ellis Jones
March 1, 1945 - 1946: COL. Jeremiah Holland
March 1, 1946 - July 3, 1946: COL. Angel Tuazon
July 12, 1946 - May 1947: COL. Lamberto Javalera
May 1947 - January 1948: COL Manuel dela Fuente
1948 - 1951 & 1962 - 1963: GEN. Eduardo Quintos
January 1, 1952 - April 8, 1953: COL. Dionisio Ojeda
April 9, 1953 - January 5, 1954: COL. Cesar V. Lucero
January 6, 1954 - October 26, 1954: COL. Telesforo Tenorio
October 27, 1954 - November 21, 1959: COL. Napoleon D Valeriano
November 22, 1954 - May 10, 1962: COL. Telesforo Tenorio
May 10, 1962 - September 17, 1965:GEN. Marcos G. Soliman
September 17, 1962: Eduardo Quintos (second time)
April 3, 1965 - May 26, 1966: COL. Eugenio Torres
May 26, 1966 - March 13, 1968:GEN. Ricardo Papa
March 14, 1968 - November 30, 1968: COL. Enrique V. Morales
December 1, 1968 - September 16, 1974: COL. Gerardo G. Tamayo
As chief of the Western Police District
December 20, 1974 - January 4, 1980: BRIG. GEN James Barbers
January 4, 1980 - December 31, 1980: P/BRIG. GEN Pedro Dela Paz
January 1, 1981 - May 1, 1986: BRIG. GEN. Narciso Cabrera
May 2, 1986 - December 21, 1989: P/MAJ GEN. Alfredo S. Lim
Some time in the 70's to late 80's Colonel Hector M Ciria Cruz became Chief of Police (WPD) a close friend with Alfredo Lim
December 22, 1989 - August 7, 1992: GEN. Ernesto Diokno
August 7, 1992 - September 7, 1992: P/CSUPT Oscar Aquino
September 7, 1992 - December 8, 1992: BRIG. GEN. Proceso  D. Almando
December 8, 1992 - November 5, 1991: P/CSUPT Romeo O. Odi
November 5, 1993 - June 16, 1996: P/CSUP Hermogenes Ebdane JR
August 3, 1998 - December 14, 1998: P/SSUPT Virtus Gil
December 16, 1998 - December 20, 1999: P/CSUPT Efren Fernandez
June 16, 1996 - August 3, 1998 & December 20, 1999 - March 15, 2001: P/CSUPT Avelino Razon (second time)
March 15, 2001 - July 29, 2002: P/CSUPT Nicolas Pasinos JR
July 31, 2022 - August 1, 2006: P/CSUPT Pedro Bulaong
As chief of the Manila Police District
July 25, 2006 - September 24, 2007: P/SSUPT. Danilo Abarzosa
September 24, 2007 - April 1, 2009: PCSUPT Roberto Rosales
April 1, 2009 - August 25, 2010: PCSUPT Rodolfo Magtibay
August 25, 2010: Francisco Villaroman (OIC)
August 27, 2010: Leocadio Santiago, Jr.
August 26, 2010 - October 19, 2011: PCSUPT Roberto P Rongavilla
October 20, 2011 - April 5, 2013: PCSUPT Alejandro Gutierrez
April 5, 2013 - July 1, 2013: Robert Po (OIC)
July 1, 2013 - January 26, 2014: PCSUPT Isagani Genabe, Jr.
February 27, 2014 - October 8, 2014: PCSUPT Rolando E Asuncion
October 8, 2014 - June 30, 2016: Rolando Z. Nana
July 1, 2016 - May 31, 2018: PBGen Joel N Coronel
July 1, 2018 -  November 7, 2018: Rolando B. Anduyan
November 18, 2018 - October 19, 2019: Police BGen. Vicente Danao - Reassigned and promoted as regional director, PRO4A.
October 20, 2019 - March 19, 2020: Police BGen. Bernabe M. Balba - Reassigned and promoted as regional director, PRO8.
March 19, 2020 - December 1, 2020: Police BGen. Rolando F. Miranda - Reassigned and promoted as regional director, PRO6.
December 1, 2020 - August 8, 2022: Police BGen. Leo M. Francisco - Reassigned and promoted as regional director, PRO6.
August 8, 2022 – present: Police BGen. Andre P. Dizon

See also
 Philippine Constabulary
 Philippine National Police

References

External links

Law enforcement in Metro Manila
Local government in Manila
Philippine National Police
1901 establishments in the Philippines
Government agencies established in 1901